The 2021 Ukrainian Super Cup was the 18th edition of Ukrainian Super Cup, an annual football match contested by the previous season's Ukrainian Premier League champions and Ukrainian Cup winners Dynamo Kyiv and league runners-up Shakhtar Donetsk. Dynamo Kyiv were the defending champions for the third consecutive year, after winning the trophy in 2018, 2019, and 2020, all against Shakhtar Donetsk.

Unlike most previous editions, the Super Cup was not a season opener, but was scheduled in the middle of the season instead. Initially the game was scheduled to be played on 24 July 2021. On 6 July, the game was postponed to 22 September 2021 on the request of both clubs because of a large number of players participating in the late stages of UEFA Euro 2020 and limited time between seasons.

While traditionally being held in Odesa, for the second year in a row the match took place in Kyiv at the Olimpiyskiy National Sports Complex. The game was to be played between rounds 8 and 9 of the 2021–22 Ukrainian Premier League.

Preparations and other background events
For the 2021 Super Cup edition, VBET was announced as the new general sponsor.

This game was the first ever Klasychne for Roberto De Zerbi as Shakhtar Donetsk manager, opposing Mircea Lucescu who spent 12 years in the same capacity, was one of the two original head coaches who participated in the first ever Super Cup in 2004, and won the trophy last year in his first Klasychne with Dynamo Kyiv.

Previous encounters 

Before this game both teams met in the Ukrainian Super Cup thirteen (13) times, the first being back in 2004. Before this game out of the previous thirteen Dynamo won 5 games and Shakhtar won 3, five more games were tied and led to penalty shootout three of which were won by Dynamo and two were won by Shakhtar.

Comparison table

Match

Details

References

External links

 Vbet Суперкубок України-2021: «Шахтар» розгромив «Динамо» й наздогнав його за кількістю титулів. uaf.ua. 22 September 2021

2021
2021–22 in Ukrainian football
FC Dynamo Kyiv matches
FC Shakhtar Donetsk matches
Sports competitions in Kyiv
September 2021 sports events in Europe